WDTT-LD, virtual channel 24 and UHF digital channel 17, is a low-powered Daystar-owned-and-operated television station licensed to Knoxville, Tennessee, United States. The station is owned by Word of God Fellowship, Inc. The signal originates at a transmitter located near Sharp's Ridge.

Daystar programming is also provided via WKNX-DT2 (virtual channel 7.2) to expand the station's viewing area.

References

External links

Daystar Television Network

Daystar (TV network) affiliates
DTT-LD
Television channels and stations established in 1989
Low-power television stations in the United States
1989 establishments in Tennessee